Jürgen Zopp was the defending champion.

Seeds

Main draw

Finals

Top half

Bottom half

References
 Main Draw
 Qualifying Draw

2013 ATP Challenger Tour
2013 Men's Singles
2013 in Russian tennis